Socialist Appeal is the British section of the International Marxist Tendency. It describes itself as a "Marxist organisation which stands for the socialist transformation of society." Its stated aim is to build a revolutionary leadership capable of leading the working class in a struggle against capitalism.

It was founded by supporters of Ted Grant and Alan Woods after they were expelled from the Militant group in the early 1990s.

Socialist Appeal is a fortnightly newspaper published by the group. Socialist Appeal also produces books, pamphlets, magazines and other Marxist educational material, sold through the Wellred Books Britain bookstore, which it operates.

Socialist Appeal describes its politics as descending from Karl Marx, Friedrich Engels, Vladimir Lenin and Leon Trotsky.

In 2013, Socialist Appeal officially launched its youth wing, the Marxist Student Federation (MSF), to provide a "national platform for Marxist ideas in the student movement." As of 2022, the MSF claims a presence at over 50 campuses across Britain. The youth wing of Socialist Appeal focuses on political discussions at university 'Marxist Societies', as well as campaigning within the labour movement.

History 

In the 1970s and 1980s, the Trotskyist Militant tendency had been a significant force within the British Labour Party. At the height of its influence in the mid-to-late 1980s, Militant had three Labour MPs, control of Liverpool City Council and later initiated the campaign that they claim forced the abandonment of the Poll tax. Grant had been one of the founders and the theoretical leader of the Militant group, but he was expelled with other supporters after the 1991 debate on the Open Turn.

A special conference decision to endorse the Open Turn by 93% to 7% entailed Militant supporters abandoning the entryist strategy of working within the Labour Party and leaving to form an independent organisation. The new party was initially known as Militant Labour, changing its name in 1997 to the Socialist Party in England and Wales while in Scotland Scottish Militant Labour instigated the formation of the Scottish Socialist Party.

The split was caused by the Militant tendency's majority adoption of the Open Turn, Grant's continued support for the tactic of entryism within the Labour Party and what Grant and Woods claimed was the bureaucratic centralist degeneration of Militant's internal regime. After the debate and conference decision, the Militant tendency claimed that Grant and Woods had begun a separate organisation and had split from Militant whilst Grant and Woods claimed to have been expelled. The Socialist Party drew the conclusions that owing to the policies followed by Labour under Neil Kinnock, it was effectively a bourgeois political party. Conversely, supporters of Socialist Appeal argued that the Labour Party was still based on trade unions and that the Labour Party retained support in the working class.

As Labour under Tony Blair embraced the Third Way and moved away from its traditional socialist roots, most Trotskyist tendencies in Britain that employed the tactic of entrism left Labour and either ran candidates under their own banner, such as the Socialist Party, or joined electoral coalitions such as the Scottish Socialist Party or the Socialist Alliance. The Socialist Party, along with other left-wing organisations, initiated the Campaign for a New Workers' Party in 2006, arguing that trade unions should break with Labour and construct their own political formation. Socialist Appeal began publishing their own journal in 1992. In 2000, the group was estimated to have around 250 supporters.

In 2013, the tendency in Britain made a turn towards the student movement by launching the Marxist Student Federation.

Following the Scottish independence referendum in which Scots voted to retain the union with the rest of the United Kingdom, the International Marxist Tendency called for "the building of those forces on the left in Scotland, on a revolutionary and internationalist basis, beginning with the Scottish Socialist Party".

In June 2017, Socialist Appeal editor Rob Sewell claimed that "the movement in the direction of revolution is being reflected on the political plane" in Britain and that "the events in Britain have a striking resemblance to the situation that existed in 1931, which Trotsky described as a pre-revolutionary situation".

In July 2021, the Labour Party's National Executive Committee banned  Socialist Appeal and ruled that its members could be automatically expelled from the Labour Party.

Economy 

Socialist Appeal is in broad agreement with the classical Marxist view that capitalism inherently results in "boom and bust" cycles as a result of overproduction and thus attempts to prevent this through monetarism or Keynesianism are not possible. Therefore, they believe the only solution to this is the introduction of democratic socialism, based on a planned and nationalised economy as well as on the socialisation of its "commanding heights" (i.e. the top 150–200 financial institutions and companies). They argue that a planned economy is able to replace production on the basis of profit with production on the basis of need.

Publications 
Socialist Appeal refers to the fortnightly newspaper of the same name. In September 2009, the publication Socialist Appeal changed from a magazine journal format to a full colour tabloid. An issue of Socialist Appeal typically contains theoretical articles, industrial reports and political analysis. 

The group also produce and publish a number of pamphlets and books through their Wellred Books publishing arm.

Socialist Appeal was also the name of two British Trotskyist newspapers associated with Ted Grant in the 1940s: one was the newspaper of the Workers International League and immediately following that of the  Revolutionary Communist Party.

It was also the name of the paper of the Trotskyist Workers Party of the United States during its period of entryism in the Socialist Party of America in 1936–1938.

Socialist Appeal is the name of the English-language newspaper of the Workers' International League, the United States section of the International Marxist Tendency and a newspaper in New Zealand which is also affiliated.

International Marxist Tendency 

Although they remain small in Britain, they are growing rapidly in size and significance and the international group to which they are affiliated known as the International Marxist Tendency (the modern International) has grown in number especially in the Indian subcontinent, as well as Latin America where they rally support for the Bolivarian Revolution and instigated the formation of the Hands Off Venezuela campaign group. As well as publishing their paper Socialist Appeal, the group has also published a number of books by Trotsky, Grant and Woods. The group has devoted much of their time to developing the multilingual website In Defence of Marxism.

Supporters of Socialist Appeal value the importance of theory highly and dedicate a large amount of space in their paper and website to theoretical articles. Socialist Appeal's editors argue that a thorough understanding of Marxism, history, economics and politics is necessary to understand the world today. They also argue that the neglect of theory in the late 1980s led to the Militant tendency turning in an ultraleft direction.

See also 
 Trotskyism

References

External links 
 Socialist Appeal official website
 In Defence of Marxism
 Wellred online bookshop
 Ted Grant Internet Archive
 Marxist Student Federation

Entryists
Factions of the Scottish Socialist Party
International Marxist Tendency
Militant tendency
Political parties established in 1992
Far-left political parties
Trotskyist organisations in the United Kingdom
1992 establishments in the United Kingdom
Organisations associated with the Labour Party (UK)
Publications established in 1992
Socialist newspapers published in the United Kingdom